John Doaninoel (March 1, 1950 – August 7, 2018) was a Papua New Guinean Roman Catholic prelate and Marist priest. He was appointed auxiliary bishop of the Roman Catholic Archdiocese of Rabaul in Papua New Guinea by Pope Benedict XVI  on December 6, 2007. He served in Rabaul from 2008 until 2011. On June 9, 2011, Doaninoel was appointed auxiliary bishop of the Roman Catholic Archdiocese of Honiara in the Solomon Islands, a position he held from 2011 until his death on August 7, 2018.

Doaninoel was born in Timputz, Bougainville Island in the present-day Autonomous Region of Bougainville in Papua New Guinea. He was ordained a Catholic priest within the Oceania Marist province in 1980.

References

1950 births
2018 deaths
21st-century Roman Catholic bishops in Papua New Guinea
Roman Catholic bishops in the Solomon Islands
People from the Autonomous Region of Bougainville
Bougainvillean Roman Catholic priests
Papua New Guinean Roman Catholic priests
Roman Catholic bishops of Rabaul
Expatriate bishops
Papua New Guinean Roman Catholic bishops